Ljubuški  is a city and municipality in Bosnia and Herzegovina. It is located in the West Herzegovina Canton, a unit of the Federation of Bosnia and Herzegovina. The Kravica cascades lie within the municipality, near the settlement of Studenci.

History
The town was first mentioned in 1444.

Yugoslav Wars

During the Bosnian War, Ljubuški served as the headquarters of the Croatian Defence Forces.

Settlements

Demographics

Population

Ethnic composition

Sports 

The city is home to Bosnia and Herzegovina's  most successful handball club, HRK Izviđač, with eight Bosnia and Herzegovina Championship titles won, two football clubs, NK Sloga Ljubuški and NK Ljubuški, and HKK Ljubuški basketball club.

Notable people
Mehmed-beg Kapetanović Ljubušak, Bosniak writer and official
Mirko Alilović, handball player
Andrija Artuković, Ustaše official
Petar Barbarić, a venerable Catholic
Tomislav Brkić, tennis player
Gordan Bunoza, footballer
Denis Buntić, handball player
Nikola Katić, footballer
Blaž Kraljević, commander of the Croatian Defence Forces (HOS)
Izidor Papo, academic
Božo Skoko, Croatian academic
Peter Tomich, World War II hero, awarded with the Medal of Honor for heroics at Pearl Harbor
Vjekoslav Vrančić, minister of NDH and writer

References

External links

 Ljubuški official webpage  
 www.ljubuski.info 
 www.ljubusaci.com 
 www.ljubuski.com

 
Populated places in Ljubuški